Ryan Block (born June 25, 1982) is a San Francisco-based technology entrepreneur. He was the editor-in-chief of AOL’s Engadget before he co-founded the community site gdgt. With gdgt's sale to AOL in 2013, he returned to the company and headed up its product group, but left in 2015 to start a new business.

Block currently co-hosts MVP, a technology podcast, with frequent collaborator Peter Rojas. He lives in San Francisco, California with his wife, Veronica Belmont.

History 

Block joined technology news website Engadget as a part-time reporter in June 2004, and started full-time in June 2005. He went on to replace the site's creator Peter Rojas as editor-in-chief in 2007.

In July 2008 Block posted on Engadget that he would be stepping down as editor-in-chief to create a new company, leaving then Associate Editor Joshua Topolsky in charge. On 1 July 2009, using $550,000 in initial seed financing received from Betaworks and True Ventures, Block and Rojas launched gdgt; a discussion forum that generates reviews and answers questions about thousands of gadgets. gdgt was sold to AOL in 2013
, and Block left the company in 2015.

Comcast support call 

In July 2014, Block and his wife attempted to disconnect their Comcast service over the telephone and were repeatedly blocked by the Comcast representative in a call which lasted 18 minutes. The last 8 minutes of this phone call was recorded by Block and posted to Reddit, immediately going viral across the internet. The next day Comcast apologized.

References

External links 

 Ryan Block's website
 Engadget

American Internet celebrities
Living people
Weblogs, Inc.
Writers from San Francisco
American technology writers
American technology company founders
AOL employees
1982 births